The Bank of Italy (Italian: Banca d'Italia,  informally referred to as Bankitalia) is the central bank of Italy and part of the European System of Central Banks. It is located in Palazzo Koch, via Nazionale, Rome. The bank's current governor is Ignazio Visco, who took the office on 1 November 2011.

Until January 1999 when Italy adopted the euro, the bank was responsible for national currency, the Italian lira. From then until euro notes and coins were issued in January 2001, lira coins and notes continued as denominations of the euro.

Functions
After the charge of monetary and exchange rate policies was shifted in 1998 to the European Central Bank, within the European institutional framework, the bank implements the decisions, issues euro banknotes and withdraws and destroys worn pieces.

The main function has thus become banking and financial supervision. The objective is to ensure the stability and efficiency of the system and compliance with rules and regulations; the bank pursues it through secondary legislation, controls and cooperation with governmental authorities.

Following a reform in 2005, which was prompted by takeover scandals, the bank has lost exclusive antitrust authority in the credit sector, which is now shared with the Italian Competition Authority.

Other functions include market supervision, oversight of the payment system and provision of settlement services, State treasury service, Central Credit Register, economic analysis and institutional consultancy.

As of 2021, the Bank of Italy owned 2,451.8 tonnes of gold, the third-largest gold reserve in the world.

History
The institution was established in 1893 from the combination of three major banks in Italy (after the Banca Romana scandal). The new central bank first issued banknotes during 1926. Until 1928, it was directed by a general manager, after this time instead by a governor elected by an internal commission of managers, with a decree from the President of the Italian Republic, for a term of seven years.

In 1863 the crisis of the world money market created panic and the rush to the counters to collect the metallic currency in exchange for the banknotes. The Italian government responded in 1866 by introducing the fiat and legal tender of paper money. The government was accused in this way of favouring the issuing banks, and a long debate called the "banking question" arose about the advisability of having one or more issuers.

The Minghetti-Finali law of 1873 established the mandatory consortium of issuing institutions among the six existing issuing institutions, the National Bank of the Sardinian States, the National Bank of Tuscany, the Tuscan Bank of Credit for Industries and Commerce of Italy, the Banca Romana, the Banco di Napoli and the Banco di Sicilia, but the measure proved insufficient.

Following the Banca Romana scandal, the reorganization of the issuing institutions became necessary.

Establishment 
Law no. 449 of 10 August 1893 of the Giolitti I government established the Bank of Italy through the merger of four banks: the National Bank in the Kingdom of Italy (formerly Banca Nazionale in the Sardinian States), the Banca Nazionale Toscana, the Banca Toscana di Credito for the Industries and Commerce of Italy and with the liquidation management of Banca Romana. With a complex series of mergers between these banks, the current Bank of Italy was formed. Some families of bankers, historical partners: Bombrini, Bastogi, Balduino, were the supporters of the operation. The institute enjoyed (together with the Banks of Naples and Sicily) the issuing privilege, it also acted as a "bank of banks" through the rediscount of bills, but did not have supervisory powers over other banks. The bank remains a private limited company and was headed by a director.

From 1900 to 1928 Bonaldo Stringher was the director, who gave the Bank the role of manager of Italian monetary policy and lender of last resort, bringing it closer to a modern central bank. In particular, he understood that a central bank cannot aim at maximizing profit (which is achieved by printing as much paper money) but must instead aim at price stability.

In 1907, the Bank of Italy coordinated the rescue of the Italian Banking Company, a major lender of FIAT, an operation that ended with the absorption of the bank in crisis into the Italian Discount Bank. In 1911 the central bank organized a consortium to rescue the steel companies (Acciaierie di Terni, Ilva and others) of which the Bank of Italy was directly creditor, financing the operation also through the issue of banknotes.

In 1912 the credit institute for cooperation, with social purposes, was established, led by the Bank of Italy and also participated by public bodies, savings banks, Monte dei Paschi di Siena, the Cassa di Previdenza, and the Credit Institution for the Cooperatives of Milan. The institute in 1929 was transformed by its director Arturo Osio into the Banca Nazionale del Lavoro.

In 1913 the Subsidy Consortium was established, led by the Bank of Italy and also participated by the Banks of Naples and Sicily, some savings banks, Monte dei Paschi di Siena and by the San Paolo Bank of Turin. In 1922 the Consortium saved Ansaldo and took control of it, and in 1923 it did the same with Banco di Roma.

In the same 1913 Francesco Saverio Nitti drew up a bill that entrusted the Bank of Italy with the supervision of other banks, but the private banks managed to avoid its approval.

In 1914 the Bank of Italy assisted the Banco di Roma, which had to devalue its capital due to losses reported in the activities in the eastern Mediterranean.

After the First World War, in 1921, it was always the Bank of Italy that led the consortium that managed the liquidation of the Italian Discount Bank and saved the Banco di Roma once again from crisis.

United States and Europe in the 20th century 

In the United States, the gradual incorporation of local credit institutions, oriented towards balancing costs and small businesses, began in favour of the large national investment banks, which had diametrically opposed budget structures and objectives.

Even with a formal corporate separation (but not patrimonial and group) which was not enough to block the rise of the political and economic interests of the large financial-industrial trusts. In fact, by simply scrolling through the names of the latest buyers, this plan continued uninterruptedly even after the war up to the 2000s.

Similarly, antitrust and European Union law in the post-war period never endowed themselves with strong legislative instruments capable of preventing undemocratic drifts inclined to the interests of the military–industrial complex, declaring, on the contrary, the legitimate existence of situations of "dominant position" in all sectors of the economy, where only the abuse could constitute a violation of the law punished with pecuniary sanctions, but without any power to intervene in the management, organization or financial engineering of large groups.

Similarly, antitrust and European Union law in the post-war period never endowed themselves with strong legislative instruments capable of preventing undemocratic drifts inclined to the interests of the military-industrial complex, declaring, on the contrary, the legitimate existence of situations of "dominant position" in all sectors of the economy, where only the abuse could constitute a violation of the law punished with pecuniary sanctions, but without any power to intervene in the management, organization or financial engineering of large groups.

The Banking Law of 1926 
Even with these strong regulatory and intervention powers, the fascist state allowed the crisis of the banks that were headed by the National Credit, the Popular Party bank, to worsen.

In this way, fascism, which equally aimed at the political control of monetary issuance, intended to strike one of the electoral strengths and of the business system that orbited around the industrial policy of the Catholic world, supported by credit institutions.

With R.D.L. 812 of 6 May 1926, the Bank of Italy obtained the exclusive right to issue the currency (the royal decree of 28 April 1910, no. 204 was thus repealed, which had confirmed the prerogative also to the Bank of Naples and the Bank of Sicily).

The subsequent R.D.L. November 6, 1926 n. 1830 entrusted the Bank of Italy with the task of supervising savings banks. In 1928 the Bank was reorganized. The general manager was joined by a governor with greater powers.

Meanwhile, in 1926 the Subsidy Consortium had been transformed into a Liquidation Institute, still under the control of the central bank. In 1933 it was absorbed by the new Institute for Industrial Reconstruction, autonomous from the Bank of Italy.

While all the banks were in very bad conditions, the Banca Nazionale del Lavoro of the self-styled socialist Arturo Osio, in 1929 confiscated eleven Catholic banks, and in 1932 the Banca Agricola Italiana which had financed SNIA Viscosa di Gualino.

Banks and the economy of the 1930s 

Italy in the 1930s had an agricultural economy, a small number of industrial families who relied on the subcontracting of local suppliers, formed by a myriad of small family-run businesses, not international and whose survival depended on large groups of industrialists, in turn, linked to commercial banks.

The savings from agriculture flowed into the rural coffers, the popular banks and the cooperative credit which financed the life of the provincial crafts, small businesses and construction. The job of the banks was to match the customers' short-term investment horizon with the long-term investments of large groups (Rediscount). National banks turned to local banks that had large deposits of deposits for smaller, low-risk loans.

The Cassa Depositi e Prestiti channelled postal savings in favour of local authorities, public institutions and infrastructures, which were a way of absorbing mass unemployment, through a vast program of public works.

The ideological basis of the law was that savings are a matter of national interest and must be protected by the State, a principle also enshrined in the Republican Constitution and concretized in the first place in the law establishing the interbank guarantee fund and in the policy of public bailouts. With other decrees of the same year, the supervisory task was extended to all Italian banks and the monopoly of issuing the currency was confirmed. The bank no longer had the right to give credit to individuals but only to other banks as a lender of last resort. public bailout policy. Finally, it had the power to require other banks to deposit a portion of the available funds with the same central bank; by varying the share, the Bank of Italy could operate credit tightening or enlargements.

The law established certain minimum capital and management requirements necessary to guarantee risk management, stability and operational continuity: minimum capital, minimum ratio between loans and deposits, credit limits, provisions for compulsory reserve.

IRI and the war 
After the "defenestration" of Bonaldo Stringher, Alberto Beneduce took over and was forced to retire in 1936 after a "heart attack" during a meeting at the Bank for International Settlements in Basel. They conceived the duty of the banks towards the public interest of the country, as the subject who had to collect savings to lend them to entrepreneurs, as a tool for development and growth. The process was to be led by a "circulation bank", which would increase the speed of circulation of money in the real economy.

The Central Bank supported the fascist monetary policy of defending the stability of the Italian lira (known as the "Quota 90"), through the reduction of discounts and advances, and financing the enormous expenses of wars in the 1930s and 1940s through the unlimited issuing of money (and the "inflation tax", not progressive with income), as Hjalmar Schacht did in Germany under Hitler.

Operationally, the government issued and sold debt securities to finance military spending, and the military industry reinvested its government profits in the purchase of such bonds as a de facto advance of future orders, fueling a closed financial circuit. In simple terms, this was something like the ECB issuing money and lending it to private banks who keep it in their current accounts with the ECB.

This mechanism was called "capital circuit." The printing of tickets and the scarcity of consumer goods created an overabundance of money that poured into bank deposits, allowing a new expansion of credit, which was directed in favour of the economic sectors themselves. given that the state paid the banks a higher interest on the BOTs than the savers. The absorption of savings into investments in fixed capital had already taken place in the First World War and industries were working with existing production capacities. Without consumption and investments, public spending by the state remained.

The war could start with a modest tax levy and inflation within the normal limits in the first months, before the black market and ration cards.

The situation followed the conflict of interest between the state entrepreneur and the state bank, albeit in the name of a higher ideological purpose.

In 1938, the government decreed the power to directly appoint presidents and vice-presidents of the board of directors of banks.

Beneduce planned to have a public bank take over the long-term credit of large companies, financed with bonds of equal duration for public works, energy, and industry. After them, the Central Bank maintained a low-profile monetary policy, consistent with the directives of fascism.

IRI operated differently, in agreement with the Italian banks and industries that supported fascism. The banks renounced exercising an option by "converting" the debts into shares (or a law in this regard), preferring not to enter directly into the ownership of the industrial groups.

The groups transferred the bank debts to IRI, which became the new owner in exchange for shares (at the book value, not always the same as the market value), until they held control of the property and therefore of management.

The debt of the IRI rose to nine and a half billion lire at the time, two-thirds of which were paid within the war, because they were drastically diluted by inflation which has the effect of lowering the real weight of debts until the accounting entries are cancelled. of issuance, but also to halve the purchasing power of small savers. The remaining debt was paid by 1953. The IRI in turn had debts towards the Bank of Italy for five billion lire: the State issued bonds for IRI for one and a half billion, "sterilizing" the debt that should have been repaid with "annuity" interest. accrued until 1971. The change of constitutional order and currency (exchange rate for conversion), and inflation meant that IRI (and industries) paid the Bank of Italy less than a third of the sum.

After the armistice of 8 September, the German authorities demanded the delivery of the gold reserve. 173 tons of gold were first transferred to the Milan office, and then to Fortezza. Traces of it were subsequently lost.

In the 1960s, the public debt increased and so did inflation. Governor Guido Carli made a policy of credit crunch to stop inflation, particularly in 1964. In general, the Bank of Italy played an important political role under this governorship. Other credit crunches were implemented between 1969 and 1970 due to the flight of capital abroad and in 1974 as a result of the oil crisis.

In March 1979 the governor of the Bank of Italy Paolo Baffi and the deputy director in charge of supervision Mario Sarcinelli were accused by the Rome public prosecutor of private interest in official acts and personal aiding and abetting. Sarcinelli was arrested, and released from prison only after being suspended from duties relating to surveillance, while Baffi avoided prison due to his age. In 1981 the two will be completely acquitted. Subsequently, the suspicion will emerge that the indictment was wanted by P2 to prevent the Bank of Italy from supervising Roberto Cavali Banco Ambrosiano.

The postwar period 
The post-war inflation, also due to the Am-lire, was fought with the credit crunch desired by the governor Luigi Einaudi, which was obtained through the compulsory reserve on deposits. In particular, the instrument of compulsory reserves of banks at the central bank was used, introduced in 1926 but never really applied. In 1948 the governor was given the task of regulating the money supply and deciding the discount rate.

The universal banks were the ones that had gained the most from war and inflation (under the Authorization Regime of the Interministerial Credit Committee), with the greatest growth in deposits.

Along with the recovery, speculative stocks and capital flight abroad appeared. Credit limits were no longer tied to equity, as equity figures were completely distorted by inflation.

The squeeze on lending, the liquidity crisis and the Eenaudian deflation pushed operators to finance themselves by placing stocks on the market and returning capital, thus blocking the rise in prices; and by resorting to self-financing (even without distributing profits), aided by the fact that inflation had made it possible to quickly amortize fixed assets whose book value was now nominal.

During the years of the Reconstruction, governor Donato Menichella governed the issue in a gradual and balanced way: he did not implement expansionary manoeuvres to encourage growth but was careful to avoid the creation of credit crunches. In this, he was helped by the low public debt. Its monetary policy program was stability for development.

A part of the available bank savings was channelled annually to the Treasury to cover the budget deficit (in the current year), while during his tenure the public debt of the state never rose above 1% of GDP, until 1964.

In July 1981, a "divorce" between the State (Ministry of the Treasury) and its central bank was initiated by the decision of the then Treasury Minister Beniamino Andreatta. From that moment on, the institute was no longer required to purchase the bonds that the government was unable to place on the market, thus ceasing the monetization of the Italian public debt that it had carried out since the Second World War up to that moment. This decision was opposed by the Minister of Finance Rino Formica, who would have liked the Bank of Italy to be required to repay at least a portion of these securities, and from the summer of 1982 a series of intra-government verbal clashes between the two ministers known as the wives' quarrel, which was followed by the fall of the second Spadolini government a few months later.

The divorce between the Ministry of the Treasury and the Bank of Italy is still considered by economic doctrine as a factor of great stabilization of inflation (which went from over 20% in 1980 to less than 5% in the following years) and a central prerequisite for guarantee the full independence of the technical monetary policy body (central bank) from the choices related to fiscal policy (under the responsibility of the government), but also a factor of considerable incidence of growth of the Italian public debt.

The law of 7 February 1992 n. 82, proposed by the then  Minister of the Treasury Guido Carli, clarifies that the decision on the discount rate is the exclusive competence of the governor and must no longer be agreed in concert with the Minister of the Treasury (the previous decree of the President of the Republic is modified in relation to the new law with the Presidential Decree of 18 July).

The euro and the 2006 reform 
The Legislative Decree 10 March 1998 n. 43 removes the Bank of Italy from management by the Italian government, sanctioning its belonging to the European system of central banks. From this date, therefore, the quantity of currency in circulation is decided autonomously by the Central Bank. With the introduction of the Euro on 1 January 1999, the Bank thus loses the function of presiding over national monetary policy. This function has since been exercised collectively by the Governing Council of the European Central Bank, which also includes the Governor of the Bank of Italy.

On 13 June 1999 the Senate of the Republic, during the XIII Legislature, discussed bill no. 4083 “Rules on the ownership of the Bank of Italy and on the criteria for appointing the Board of Governors of the Bank of Italy”. This bill would like the state to acquire all the shares of the institute, but it is never approved.

On January 4, 2004, the weekly "Famiglia Cristiana" reports, for the first time in history, the list of participants in the capital of the Bank of Italy with the relative shares. The source is a Mediobanca Research & Studies dossier, directed by the researcher Fulvio Coltorti, who, by investigating backwards on the balance sheets of banks, insurance companies and institutions, and gradually noting the shares that indicated a shareholding in the capital of the Bank of Italia managed to reconstruct a large part of the list of participants of the highest Italian financial institution.

On September 20, 2005, the list of shareholders was officially made available by the Bank of Italy; until now it was considered confidential. On December 19, 2005, after intense press campaigns and criticism of his actions in the context of the Bancopoli scandal, Governor Antonio Fazio resigned. A few days later, Mario Draghi, who took office on January 16, 2006, was appointed in his place.

The law of 28 December 2005, n. 262, as part of various measures to protect savings, introduces for the first time a term to the mandate of the governor and the members of the directorate. It also dealt with (article 19, paragraph 10) the issue of ownership of the capital of the Bank of Italy, providing for the redefinition of the Bank's shareholding structure by means of a government regulation to be issued within three years of the law's entry into force. This regulation should have governed the methods of transferring shares held by "subjects other than the State or other public bodies". The delegation made by law 262/2005, therefore, expired without the regulation being issued, but the right to ownership of the shares of the current participants is in any case safeguarded by a provision of the Bank's Statute. On the basis of law 262/2005, Mario Draghi becomes the first governor to have a term of six years, renewable once for a further six years.

Organization

Governing bodies
The bank's governing bodies are the General Meeting of Shareholders, the board of directors, the governor, the director general and three deputy directors-general; the last five constitute the directorate.

The general meeting takes place yearly and with the purpose of approving accounts and appointing the auditors. The board of directors has administrative powers and is chaired by the governor (or by the director-general in his absence). Following a reform in 2005, the governor lost exclusive responsibility regarding decisions of external relevance (i.e. banking and financial supervision), which has been transferred to the directorate (by majority vote). The director-general is responsible for the day-to-day administration of the bank and acts as governor when absent.

The board of auditors assesses the bank's administration and compliance with the law, regulations and statute.

Appointment
The directorate's term of office lasts six years and is renewable once. The appointment of the governor is the responsibility of the government, head of the board of directors, with the approval of the president (formally a decree of the president). The board of directors is elected by the shareholders according to the bank statute.

On 25 October 2011, Silvio Berlusconi nominated Ignazio Visco to be the bank's new governor to replace Mario Draghi when he left to become president of the European Central Bank in November.

Shareholders
Banca d'Italia had 300,000 shares with a nominal value of €25,000. Originally scattered around the banks of Italy, the shares now accumulated due to the merger of the banks in the 1990s. The status of the bank states that a minimum of 54% of profits would go to the Italian government, and only a maximum of 6% of profits would be distributed as dividends according to share ratios.

See also 

 Banking in Italy
 Commissione Nazionale per le Società e la Borsa
 Economy of Italy
 Istituto Poligrafico e Zecca dello Stato
 Italian lira
 Euro
 Governor of the Bank of Italy

References

External links

 

Banks of Italy
Italia
Italy
Banks established in 1893
Italian companies established in 1893
Banknote printing companies